Neauphle-le-Château is a commune in the Yvelines department in the Île-de-France region in north-central France.

History
Neauphle-le-Château gained international fame in 1978 when, on October 8, Iranian Islamic leader Ayatollah Ruhollah Khomeini rented and moved into a house there following his exile by the regime of Shah Mohammad Reza Pahlavi in the midst of the Iranian Revolution, and after being deported from Iraq where he was taking refuge amongst the Shi'a community. The Ayatollah continued to reside there until the following year when he returned to Iran following the collapse of the Shah's regime and later became Iran's Supreme Leader. Due to the Ayatollah's time residing in Neauphle-le-Château, the street in Tehran on which the French Embassy in Iran is located and was previously known as Faranseh (France) street, is now renamed after the village. The property where he lived, at the corner of the Chevreuse Road and Jardins Path has long been fenced off and locked and the former dwelling is now destroyed.

It was also the home of Deanna Durbin, a Hollywood actress, until her death on April 17, 2013.

Transportation
The center of the village is about 2.2km away from the Villiers–Neauphle–Pontchartrain station, served by the Transilien Line N, which connects to Versailles and Paris (Gare Montparnasse).

See also
Communes of the Yvelines department

References

External links
 
 Neauphle-le-Château city council website (in French)

Communes of Yvelines
Iranian Revolution
Ruhollah Khomeini